That Lucky Touch is a 1975 British-West German comedy film directed by Christopher Miles and starring Roger Moore, Susannah York and Shelley Winters.

The film was shot at Pinewood Studios, with location shooting around Brussels. The film's sets were designed by the art director Jack Maxsted. It was originally entitled Heaven Save Us from Our Friends.

Plot
An international arms dealer, at a NATO meeting to sell weaponry, becomes entangled with a female journalist from the Washington Post whose worldview is very different to his.

Cast
 Roger Moore as Michael Scott
 Susannah York as Julia Richardson
 Shelley Winters as Diana Steedeman
 Lee J. Cobb as Lt. Gen. Henry Steedman
 Jean-Pierre Cassel as Leo
 Raf Vallone as Gen. Peruzzi
 Sydne Rome as Sophie
 Donald Sinden as British Gen. Armstrong
 Michael Shannon as Lt. Davis
 Aubrey Woods as Viscount L'Ardey
 Alfred Hoffman as Berckman
 Vincent Hall as David Richardson
 Julie Dawn Cole as Tina Steedman
 Fabian Cevallos as Photographer
 Timothy Carlton as Tank commander
 Takis Emmanuel as Arab Sheik

References

External links
 
 
 

1975 films
West German films
English-language German films
Films directed by Christopher Miles
1975 comedy films
Films shot at Pinewood Studios
Films shot in Brussels
British comedy films
Films about journalists
Films set in Belgium
Films scored by John Scott (composer)
Films with screenplays by John Briley
1970s English-language films
1970s British films
1970s German films